Kim Dae-wook (Hangul: 김대욱, Hanja: 金大旭; born 23 November 1987) is a South Korean footballer who plays as a defender for East Coast Bays in the NRFL Championship. Besides South Korea, he has played in New Zealand.

Kim scored Auckland City's only goal in a 1–2 defeat to Kashima Antlers in the 2016 FIFA Club World Cup. He has also scored two goals for the club in the OFC Champions League and helped the club win their sixth consecutive Champions League title in 2016.

References

External links

 

1987 births
Living people
Association football midfielders
South Korean footballers
Auckland City FC players
FC Anyang players
K League 2 players
South Korean expatriate sportspeople in New Zealand
South Korean expatriate footballers
Expatriate association footballers in New Zealand